Alexandre Camille Taponier (2 February 1749–13 April 1831) commanded an infantry division in several battles during the French Revolutionary Wars. He joined the French Royal Army in 1767. He became a chef de bataillon on 15 October 1793 and a general of division less than two months later on 7 November, a speed of promotion that is astonishing. He led his division at the end of 1793 in the battles of Kaiserslautern, Froeschwiller and Second Wissembourg.

He led a division at the Siege of Luxembourg in 1794–1795 and at Ettlingen and Neresheim in 1796. That summer, army commander Jean Victor Marie Moreau forced him to resign after accusing him of demanding irregular contributions. Placed on active service again, he commanded the 13th Military Division for a few months in 1799–1800. He became a member of the Légion d'Honneur in 1805 but was not employed during the Napoleonic Wars and retired from military service in 1811 at age 62. Taponier is one of the names inscribed under the Arc de Triomphe on Column 5.

References

French soldiers
French generals
French military personnel of the French Revolutionary Wars
French Republican military leaders of the French Revolutionary Wars
People from Drôme
1749 births
1831 deaths
Names inscribed under the Arc de Triomphe